Joseph Fournier may refer to:

 J. Michel Fournier (1905–1992), Canadian politician
 Joseph Augustin Fournier (1759–1828), French general